Giuseppe Cades (March 4, 1750 – December 8, 1799) was an Italian sculptor, painter, and engraver. 

Cades was born in Rome. He studied under Mancini and Domenico Corvi, gaining a prize in 1765 with his picture of Tobias recovering his Sight. He visited Florence in 1766,  and two years later executed an altar-piece for the church of San Benedetto in Turin and in 1771 another for the church of Santi Apostoli. He also decorated the Palazzo Chigi with frescoes, landscapes, and scenes from Tasso. He has left two etchings, Christ blessing Little Children and The Death of Leonardo da Vinci. He joined the Accademia di San Luca of Rome in 1786. He died in Rome.

References

1750 births
1799 deaths
18th-century Italian painters
Italian male painters
18th-century Italian sculptors
Italian male sculptors
Italian engravers
18th-century Italian male artists